Telania is a town in Navrongo, Northern Ghana.

Populated places in the Upper East Region